Hugo Miguel Fernandes Vieira (born 11 August 1976), known simply as Hugo, is a Portuguese retired footballer who played as a central defender.

He amassed Primeira Liga totals of 186 matches and four goals over 14 seasons, representing in the competition Braga, Sporting, Vitória de Setúbal and Beira-Mar. He played abroad with Sampdoria.

Club career
Born in Braga, Hugo played during his early career with S.C. Braga, making his first-team – and Primeira Liga – debut at the age of 19. He moved to Italian club U.C. Sampdoria in 1997, being regularly used during his three-year stint but suffering Serie A relegation in his second season.

Hugo returned to Portugal in summer 2000, joining Sporting CP and appearing scarcely for the 2002 league champions (also helping to the Taça de Portugal the same season). After six seasons he left as a free agent to Vitória de Setúbal, where he also featured sparingly.

In 2008–09, Hugo played the most games he had in years, but spent most of the campaign as defensive midfielder. Aged 33, he had his first second division experience, signing with S.C. Beira-Mar and helping the Aveiro side win the league in his first year and return to the top flight, after a three-year absence.

Honours
Sporting
Primeira Liga: 2001–02
Taça de Portugal: 2001–02
Supertaça Cândido de Oliveira: 2002

Vitória Setúbal
Taça da Liga: 2007–08

Beira-Mar
Segunda Liga: 2009–10

References

External links

1976 births
Living people
Sportspeople from Braga
Portuguese footballers
Association football defenders
Association football utility players
Primeira Liga players
Liga Portugal 2 players
S.C. Braga players
Sporting CP footballers
Vitória F.C. players
S.C. Beira-Mar players
Serie A players
Serie B players
U.C. Sampdoria players
Portugal youth international footballers
Portuguese expatriate footballers
Expatriate footballers in Italy
Portuguese expatriate sportspeople in Italy